Karina Jørgensen (born 10 October 1988) is an Indian-born Danish badminton player. She is the former European junior champion in the girls' singles event in 2007. In the senior event, Jørgensen was part of the Danish winning team at the 2010 European Women's Team and 2011 European Mixed Team Championships.

Achievements

European Junior Championships 
Girls' singles

BWF International Challenge/Series 
Women's singles

  BWF International Challenge tournament
  BWF International Series tournament
  BWF Future Series tournament

References

External links 

1988 births
Living people
Danish people of Indian descent
Danish female badminton players